Bernard Vincent Hunt (May 18, 1891 – July 16, 1928) was a Canadian professional ice hockey player. He played with the Toronto Tecumsehs, Toronto Ontarios, Toronto Shamrocks, and Montreal Canadiens of the National Hockey Association. He died after a car accident in 1928.

References

External links
Bert Hunt at JustSportsStats

1891 births
1928 deaths
Canadian ice hockey defencemen
Ice hockey people from Ontario
Montreal Canadiens (NHA) players
Road incident deaths in Ohio
Sportspeople from Kingston, Ontario
Toronto Ontarios players
Toronto Shamrocks players
Toronto Tecumsehs players